Scartella nuchifilis is a species of combtooth blenny found in the eastern Atlantic Ocean, in the Ascension Islands.  This species reaches a length of  SL.

References

nuchifilis
Fish described in 1836